Wanniarachchige Malini Senehelatha Fonseka, popularly as Malini Fonseka (Sinhala:මාලිනී ෆොන්සේකා) (born 30 April 1947, in Kelaniya) is an actress in Sri Lankan cinema, theatre and television as well as a director. Often considered as the "Queen of Sinhalese cinema", Fonseka first became widely known when she won the 'Best Actress Award' at the 1969 National State Drama Festival. This was followed by Sarasaviya Best Actress Awards for Hingana Kolla in 1980, Aradhana in 1982 and Yasa Isuru in 1983. Apart from cinema, she is also a former member of Sri Lanka Parliament.

Her cinema career has spanned seven decades and began with Tissa Liyansooriya's Punchi Baba in 1968. She has won the Slim Nielsen Peoples' Award for the Most Popular Actress a record twelve times in a row. In 2010, she was named by CNN as one of Asia's 25 greatest film actors of all time.

Biography

Early life
Born as the third child of eleventh siblings to Gilbert Fonseka who worked at Government Press and Seelwathie Fonseka at Peliyagoda, Kelaniya. After Malani was born, her family moved to Jambugasmulle, Nugegoda. In 1952 she started her education at St. John's College, Nugegoda until the 5th grade. After moving of the family to Wedamulle, Kelaniya she was enrolled at Gurukula Maha Vidyalaya, Kelaniya until completing her education. Her eldest brother Dayananda Fonseka died in 2012.

Family background
Three of her sisters - Sriyani, Rasadari, Damayanthi and two brothers - Dayananda and Ananda entered the film industry. Her sister Damayanthi Fonseka entered cinema with the film Madol Duwa. She is married to filmmaker Prasanna Vithanage. Malini is also the aunt of popular actresses Samanalee Fonseka and Senali Fonseka as well as sister-in-law of Karunarathna Hangawaththa. Her nephew Ashan is also an actor. Her granddaughter Kushenya Sayumi entered cinema with the film Rookada Panchi. She is the daughter of Samanalee's brother Asanga Fonseka and Imalka Samaraweera.

Sister Sriyani has acted in popular films such as Lokuma Hinawa, Hondai Narakai, Thilaka Saha Thilakaa, Niwena Ginna and Selinage Walawwa. Rasadari Fonseka has acted in films such as Situ Kumariyo and Athin Athata. Rasadari is married to fellow actor Karunarathna Hangawaththa. Malini's elder brother Dayananda died in 2012.

Ananda Fonseka started acting with Thilaka Saha Thilakaa and continued to act in some films such as Eya Dan Loku Lamayek, Wasanthaye Dawasak, Anupama, Bamba Ketu Hati and Sasara Chethana. He also directed the film Umayangana and worked as a still photographer as well. His daughter Samanalee is a popular film and television actress. She acted in critically acclaimed films such as Motor Bicycle, Davena Vihagun and Premaya Nam. Ananda died on 16 October 2020 at the age of 70.

Her brother Upali Fonseka died on 30 May 2020 by COVID-19 complication while at London. He was the father of popular actress Senali Fonseka. Senali started acting with the blockbuster film Siri Parakum and then made popular characters in Haara Kotiya and Vijayaba Kollaya. In 2021 at Sumathi Awards, Senali won the Most Popular Actress Award and Samanalee won the Best Actress Award.

Political life

In April 2010, she was appointed to the  Sri Lanka Parliament as a  National List of United People's Freedom Alliance.

Career 
Fonseka started her acting career with stage dramas. In 1963, she made her entry to stage dramas with "Noratha Ratha". In 1968, Fonseka won the best stage drama actress national award for her performance in Akal Wessa. She has since played the lead role in 14 stage dramas. She entered the cinema industry through one of her brothers, Ananda Fonseka, who was both a film director and producer but was introduced to the cinema itself by Tissa Liyansuriya and Joe Abeywickrama.

She made her debut with Tissa Liyansuriya's Punchi Baba (The little Baby) in 1968. These films were followed by Abudasse kale, Dahasak Sithuwili and Adarawanthayo in the same year. With the critical success she gained with these, she was offered the lead role by several movie directors of the time. Fonseka has acted in over 140 movies since then, some of which were international movies. Malini's career was enhanced with her work alongside Gamini Fonseka  who had a long journey in the history of the silver screen. Malini stated at Gamini's funeral in 2004, "His performance had appeal across the board and I had the good fortune of being associated with Gamini. The cinema of that era is slowly fading away and the passing away of Gamini is another step towards that direction".

Some of her successful films are Nidhanaya by Lester James Peiris,  Siripala Saha Ranmenika by Amaranath Jayathilake,  Eya Den Loku Lamayek and Bambaru Ewith by Dharmasena Pathiraja. She achieved a significant milestone in her artistic career with Sasara Chetana in 1984, where she became both its director and producer. She has directed two other films so far: Ahimsa in 1987 and Sthree in 1991. She paired up with popular Tamil actor, Sivaji Ganeshan in Pilot Premnath in 1978. Later on, she also worked in the television industry. Fonseka has won praise for her performance in  Manalada Puthe Kiri Dunne, Pitagamkarayo, Kemmura, and Ambu Daruwo teledramas. She won the Sumathi Best Teledrama Actress Awards for her roles in Pitagamkarayo and Kemmura.

She also made her mark as a teledrama director, with successful creations such as Sanasili Suwanda. She even had the honour of being the first female teledrama director in the history of Sri Lanka teledrama history, when she, both directed and acted in her first teledrama Nirupamala. She then acted in the Buddhist dramatic film Uppalawanna directed by Sunil Ariyaratne.

Awards

Fonseka was the first Sri Lankan actress to reach international heights, winning a special Jury award at the Moscow International Film Festival in 1975. This was to be the first of her many international awards. She also won an award at the New Delhi Film Festival in 1977.

Apart from the many Sarasaviya Awards she has won, she has also earned other honours like the Presidential Awards, OCIC Awards and also international recognition. She also received awards including the "Best Actress Award" for the teledrama "Kemmura" at the Sumathi Tele Awards Ceremony, 2000 and Wishva Prasadhini Award as appreciation of her service to the cinema industry from the President in 1996.

Malini Fonseka felicitation ceremony titled Maliniye was held at the BMICH on 30 April 2003 with the participation of President Chandrika Bandaranaike Kumaratunga for her four decades of contribution to the Cinema of Sri Lanka in more than 150 films.

Sri Lankans living in the US gathered in large numbers at Los Angeles to honour Malini in January 2008. A special dinner was hosted by the Consular General of Sri Lanka Jaliya Wickramasuriya and Mrs. Wickramasuriya to honor her. A special ceremony was organised for her to receive an Appreciative Plaque by the Consulate General of Los Angeles Jaliya Wickramasuriya. In 2019, she was honored with Janabhimani Honorary Award at the Bandaranaike Memorial International Conference Hall.

Deepashika Award Festival

|-
|| 1973 ||| – || Most Popular Actress ||  
|-
|| 1974 ||| Nidhanaya || Most Popular Actress ||

Sarasaviya Awards

|-
|| 1975 ||| People's vote || Most Popular Actress ||  
|-
|| 1980 ||| Hingana Kolla || Best Actress ||  
|-
|| 1980 ||| People's vote || Most Popular Actress ||  
|-
|| 1981 ||| People's vote || Most Popular Actress ||  
|-
|| 1982 ||| Aradhana || Best Actress ||  
|-
|| 1983 ||| People's vote || Most Popular Actress ||  
|-
|| 1983 ||| People's vote || Most Popular Actress ||  
|-
|| 1983 ||| Yasa Isuru || Best Actress ||  
|-
|| 1984 ||| People's vote || Most Popular Actress ||  
|-
|| 1985 ||| People's vote || Most Popular Actress ||  
|-
|| 1986 ||| People's vote || Most Popular Actress ||

Vanitha Viththi Award Festival

|-
|| 1992 ||| People's vote || Most Popular Lady ||  
|-
|| 1993 ||| People's vote || Most Popular Lady ||

Presidential Film Awards

|-
|| 1980 ||| Bambaru Awith || Best Actress ||  
|-
|| 1981 ||| Wasanthaye Dawasak || Best Actress ||  
|-
|| 1983 ||| Aradhana || Best Actress ||  
|-
|| 2004 ||| Wekanda Walawwa || Best Actress ||  
|-
|| 2006 ||| Ammawarune || Best Actress ||

SIGNIS OCIC Awards

|-
|| 1978 ||| Films in 1977 || Best Creative Actress ||  
|-
|| 1981 ||| Dandu Monara || Best Creative Actress ||  
|-
|| 1981 ||| Films in 1980 || Creative Female Acting ||  
|-
|| 1992 ||| Madhu Samaya || Creative Female Acting ||

UNDA Awards

|-
|| 1993 ||| Mahamera Pamula || Best Actress ||  
|-
|| 1997 ||| Pitagamkarayo || Best Actress ||  
|-
|| 2007 ||| Sisila Ima || Best Actress ||

Sumathi Awards

|-
|| 1998 ||| Pitagamkarayo || Best Actress ||  
|-
|| 2002 ||| Kemmura || Best Actress ||

Navaliya Vendol Film Awards

|-
|| 2006 ||| People's vote || Appealing Film Actress ||  
|-
|| 2007 ||| People's vote || Appealing Film Actress ||  
|-
|| 2008 ||| People's vote || Appealing Film Actress ||

Other Local Awards

|-
|| 1966 ||| Akal Wessa || State Drama Festival: Best Actress ||  
|-
|| 1969 ||| Punchi Baba || Broadcasting Awards: Best Supporting Actress ||  
|-
|| 1973 ||| Nidhanaya || Reviewers Film Awards: Best Actress ||  
|-
|| 1992 ||| Madhu Samaya || Swarna Sanka Film Awards: Best Actress ||  
|-
|| 2016 ||| Contribution to Cinema || Prathibha Prabha Award (at Raigam Tele'es) ||  
|-
|| 2018 ||| Contribution to Cinema || Lifetime Achievement Award (at Derana Film Awards) ||  
|-
|| – ||| Contribution to Cinema || Swarna Rajani Award (by Kala Lanka Foundation) ||  
|-
|| – ||| Contribution to Drama || Felicitation Award (by Malani Fonseka Felicitation Committee) ||  
|-
|| – ||| Contribution to Cinema || Felicitation Award (by National Film Corporation) ||

International Awards

|-
|| 1976 ||| Humanship on Cinema, Art and for Peace, Friendship Among Nations || 9th Moscow International Film Festival Honorary Diploma Certificate ||  
|-
|| 1978 ||| Siripala Saha Ranmenika || 6th Indian International Film Festival: Honorary Diploma Certificate ||  
|-
|| 2009 ||| Akasa Kusum || 39th International Indian Film Festival  Silver Peacock Award and Certificate for Best Performance||  
|-
|| 2010 ||| Akasa Kusum || 7th Levanthe International Film Festival: Best Actress ||  
|-
|| 2012 ||| Outstanding Achievement in Film || Kandy International film Festival: Excellence ||

Filmography 
Since her first film in 1968, she has acted in more than 150 films through 6 decades.

 No. denotes the Number of Sri Lankan film in the Sri Lankan cinema.

Director and actor

 

|-

 
|-

|-

References

External links 
 

 Malani Fonseka , Sri Lanka Cinema Database
 Malani Fonseka , National Film Corporation
 Malini wins Silver Peacock for Akasa Kusum

1947 births
Living people
Sri Lankan actor-politicians
Sri Lankan film actresses
Members of the 14th Parliament of Sri Lanka
20th-century Sri Lankan actresses
21st-century Sri Lankan actresses
Women legislators in Sri Lanka
Sinhalese actresses
21st-century Sri Lankan women politicians
Kala Keerthi